Aplin Islet is a small island north of Shelburne Bay in far north Queensland, Australia about 140 km north of Cape Grenville, Cape York Peninsula in the Great Barrier Reef Marine Park Queensland, Australia. It is within the Shire of Cook. The island has an area of about 4 hectares. It rises to a height of 5.82 meters above sea level.

It is about 30 km east of Orford Ness.

Ecology
Aplin Islet is a restricted access area to protect nesting seabirds.

Crocodiles have been sighted on Aplin Islet.

See also

 List of islands of Australia

References

Islands on the Great Barrier Reef
Uninhabited islands of Australia